Keegan Longueira (born 1 April 1991) is a South African adventurer, motivational speaker, and author. He currently resides in Witbank (eMalahleni) a coal mining town in the Province of Mpumalanga in South Africa. Longueira rose to prominence in 2015 after completing a solo bicycle expedition across Africa from Cairo to Cape Town. On 2 March 2015, he arrived at the V&A Waterfront in Cape Town in a time of 59 days, 8 hours and 30 minutes, and became the Guinness Record holder for the fastest man ever to cross the continent on Bicycle. Keegan for 4 years had done major expeditions within South Africa as training and build up to the World Record Attempt. He now speaks to churches, businesses and major companies about his expeditions and his lessons learnt on the road. Longueira uses his story to influence and touch lives and inspire people to live their dream, regardless of how far away it may seem when starting.

Biography

Keegan Longueira was born in Vryheid in Kwa-Zulu Natal South Africa. His dad was a coal miner and his mom a school teacher. The family moved to Standerton soon after his birth and he grew up there. Keegan has always been a keen sportsman and played rugby, cricket, tennis, football and also competed in karate, swimming and wrestling. At the age of 6 his family moved to Witbank where he attended St Thomas Aquinas school. He excelled in sports and made provincial sides for hockey and swimming while acquiring a love for creative writing. At age 15 he went to St Benedict's College Boarding School in Johannesburg. Keegan worked at a small triathlon shop  before deciding to attend the University of Johannesburg to study a BSc in Sports Science. He dropped out before April and then for a short while tried his hand at being a teacher. Before the end of the year he left on a mission trip to Zambia which had a life changing effect on him. Keegan then left for Brazil November 2010 where he volunteered in an orphanage for 3 weeks. In January 2011 he tried his hand at studying again (BCom in Marketing Management) at the University of Pretoria. Keegan promised to see the year out but his belief in wanting his life to represent something bigger led him to de-register from University, buy a second hand bicycle and embark on an expedition across South Africa.

Expeditions

Kilimanjaro 2017

In 2017, the night of completing his first ever CrossFit Open, a worldwide 5 week online competition, Keegan and his dad board a plane for Kilimanjaro National Airport in Tanzania. The Father and son team set out to conquer Africa's highest peak after speaking about it for many years. The trip was arranged and done through Kibo Slopes Safaris who Keegan had got in contact with doing his "Cairo to Cape Town" bicycle expedition. On March 30 after a grueling, through the night hike through ice and snow, Manuel Longueira (Keegan's Dad) had to make the tough decision to turn back for base camp after suffering from altitude sickness. Keegan pressed on with one other Guide and managed to summit at approximately 8:30am. It was Keegan's first ever mountain expedition which definitely had an influence on fueling future expeditions.

7 Days in Swaziland

In July 2017 Keegan partnered up with adventurer, Zakkie Odendaal, who had recently completed an entire South African Coastline Expedition. The two discussed traveling to a country never visited before and relying totally on the kindness and hospitality of complete strangers. The challenge, to survive 7 Days in Swaziland with only R70 (5 US dollars approximately at the time) which meant a tight budget of only R10 a day for anything they needed. This made it just possible to buy a small meal in case they could not find anything. Zakkie who was the main brain behind the expedition, fresh off her, Coastline Walk, aimed to visit every part of Swaziland with the allotted days. The two managed just that visiting as far up in the country as Piggs Peak as far south as Nhlangano and as far east as Simunye and Big Bend. Mbabane, the capital city, was the first main city they visited and launched their seven days from there with a lift from a stranger. Darron Raw from Swazi Adventures was a major source of help and guidance to the two pointing them towards all the historic and interesting sites. Climbing Sebebe rock seemed to be a highlight for both travellers. Not only did they survive on a show string budget, they had some incredible adventure tales to tell from it.

Morocco to Norway

On March 12, 2016 Keegan left on his second major expedition in order to raise money for charity. His goal was to cycle from Casablanca Morocco Africa to Norway. The journey saw ride his bicycle solo across Morocco, Spain, France, Belgium, Netherlands, Germany, Denmark, Sweden and eventually end the trip in Oslo Norway. It took him 3 months to complete the trip which saw him take many days off to speak to people about the journey and the charity he was raising money for. They Charity Forgotten Continent was a Non Profit organization started by Keegan and a team of directors to raise money and awareness for sport out reach project to conduct in Africa. Keegan was quoted as saying he would be back to complete work on the Africa Cairo to Cape town route after the poverty prompted him to start the Organisation.

Witbank to Cape Town

The title of his first expedition (The Cape Trek Project) eventually become the name of his company, The Cape Trek Project (Pty) Ltd. Keegan's first bicycle expedition across South Africa stretched from Witbank to Cape Town. Keegan used this trip to raise money for CANSA first and then Operation Smile. He completed the first trip in 22 Days, the second in 10 days and the third in 14.

Witbank to Ballito

His fourth expedition was done in aid of Cancer once again but was done with one of his good friends, Brent den Bakker The two cycled towards the sea to meet up with a primary school hockey team, The Travelling Pinks, who would be playing three matches to raise money for charity. Keegan was the coach of the team at that time.

Cairo to Cape Town. Guinness World Record.

His fifth and biggest expedition took place in 2015. He flew to Cairo from South Africa on 31 January 2014 and rolled out of the Cairo el Borg on 2 January 2015 to cycle to Cape Town as fast as he could. He was chasing Robert Knoll's World Record of 70 days. ! The early journey was plagued by injury and skin infections and by the time he reached Wadi Halfa (Sudan) many thought the record opportunity had past. 4 Days behind record pace, Keegan cut out planned rest days to catch up on time lost. He crossed Sudan, Ethiopia, Kenya, Tanzania, Zambia and Botswana before eventually arriving back in South Africa. En-route Keegan suffered from diarrhoea, severe sun burn, cramps and dehydration, survived a near robbery at knife point (twice), was spat on in Ethiopia and hit with rocks thrown by kids. Despite this, Keegan entually reached Cape Town on 2 March 2015 to become the fastest man across the African Continent.

Operation Smile

Keegan partnered up with Operation Smile in 2013 after hearing a talk done by David Grier, the South African adventurer who ran the Great Wall of China. David shared the story about kids whose parent couldn't pay for their children's cleft lip and palate surgeries and the complications they would encounter in their lives. The pictures on the slide show touched Keegan deeply and after the talk he walked up to David and asked to be involved. Since that day, The Cape Trek Project and Keegan have raised an incredible amount of money for the organization. Costing just R5 500 to not only repair a child's palate and lip but also their life, gives these people another chance at life. Keegan has always maintained that it would have been impossible to do the things he had done if he had a deformity like this and has committed to helping others.
.

References

1991 births
Living people
People from Vryheid
South African motivational speakers